Logandale is located in Clark County, Nevada. It was an unincorporated town in Clark County until 1981 when it was merged with  Overton to create the unincorporated town of Moapa Valley. The community is the home of the annual Clark County Fair and Rodeo. The Las Vegas Metropolitan Police Department patrols the town.

History

Established on the west side of the Muddy River in 1865, Logandale was originally named St. Joseph.  It was moved and renamed New St. Joseph, or St. Joseph #2 in 1868, by settlers driven out of their first town of Saint Joseph, Nevada on the east side of the Muddy River when it burned down.  It also acquired the post office established in the old town on August 26, 1867.

The new Saint Joseph like the other Mormon settlements in the Moapa Valley was abandoned in 1871 due to a tax dispute with the state of Nevada. Its post office closed in October 1871 but became active again on in May 1876.  Following the Mormon return to Overton in 1880, in November 1883 the post office operations were moved there.
  
The town began to revive in 1912 around a railroad station with the name Logan, which some believe was named for a Civil War veteran who settled on the abandoned town site, although this has never been documented. It was subsequently renamed Logandale because the mail kept winding up in Logan, Utah.

Geography 
Logandale is located at the north end of Moapa Valley. The town can be accessed by taking exit 93 off of Interstate Highway 15, going south on Highway 169.

Demographics
Logandale is in the Moapa Valley, Nevada Census Bureau Census-designated place (CDP).

Media 
KADD is licensed to the town.

Culture 
The Clark County Fair and Rodeo is held annually in Logandale.

Education
The Clark County School District serves the area.

Notes

Unincorporated communities in Clark County, Nevada
Populated places established in 1912
Unincorporated towns in Nevada
1912 establishments in Nevada